John Charles Bigham, 1st Viscount Mersey,  (3 August 1840 – 3 September 1929) was a British jurist and politician. After early success as a lawyer and a less successful spell as a politician, he was appointed a judge and worked in commercial law.

After his retirement, Mersey remained active in public affairs and is probably best remembered for heading the official Board of Trade inquiries into the sinking of steamships, most notably RMS Titanic, RMS Lusitania and RMS Empress of Ireland.

Early life
Bigham was born in Liverpool, the second son of John Bigham, a prosperous merchant, and his wife, Helen, née East. He was educated at the Liverpool Institute High School for Boys, and the University of London, where he studied law.

Bigham left the university without taking a degree. He then travelled to Berlin and Paris to continue his education. Called to the bar in 1870 by the Middle Temple, he practised commercial law in and around his native city. On 17 August 1871  he married Georgina Sarah Rogers, also from Liverpool. The first of their three sons, Charles Clive Bigham (2nd Viscount Mersey), was born in 1872.

Barrister and judge

In 1883, Bigham was named a Queen's Counsel. His commercial practice prospered. In 1885, he tried his hand at politics, standing as a Liberal candidate for Parliament at the Liverpool constituency of East Toxteth, but lost. In 1892, he stood unsuccessfully in another Liverpool seat, the Exchange constituency. He was finally elected at his third attempt in 1895, when he stood as a Liberal Unionist. 

He was never able to make a great political impact, and his interest in politics was less than that in his legal work, which continued to flourish. During his last decade as a barrister, he was so in demand that he became one of the richest lawyers in his circle.

In October 1897, Bigham was named a judge to the Queen's Bench, continuing his work in business law, and disqualifying him being an MP. He was knighted the following month.

He was president of the Railway and Canal Commission, worked in the bankruptcy courts and reviewed courts-martial sentences that were handed down during the Second Boer War. He was appointed President of the Probate, Divorce and Admiralty Division in 1909 but found the divorce work unfulfilling and retired in 1910. He was raised to the peerage as Baron Mersey, of Toxteth in the County Palatine of Lancaster, the same year.

RMS Titanic
There was some criticism of his handling of the inquiry. Some felt that he was biased towards the Board of Trade and the major shipping concerns and cared too little about finding out why the ship sank. In 1998, the historian Daniel Butler described Mersey as "autocratic, impatient and not a little testy" but noted the "surprising objectivity" of the inquiry's findings. However, Peter Padfield later concluded that there had been "crazy deductions, distortions, prejudice, and occasional bone-headed obstinacy of witnesses and the court".

About the last, Mersey is among those suspected by conspiracy theorists of a coverup. His biographer Hugh Mooney writes that such suspicions are wholly conjectural, but "the conclusion of the inquiry (which blamed Germany for the tragedy without reservation) was without doubt politically convenient". Mersey was raised in the peerage from baron to viscount in 1916.

Later life
In his later years, Mersey was beset by deafness, but continued to work actively and returned to the bench in his eighties when the divorce courts had a heavy backlog. Mooney writes that "he helped to clear the lists with all his old efficiency". His wife died in 1925, and he died four years later at Littlehampton in Sussex, aged 89.

Mersey's third son (although the second surviving) was Sir Trevor Bigham, who became Deputy Commissioner of Police of the Metropolis. His first son, Colonel Charles Clive Bigham, survived the sinking of the passenger ship  in 1915.

Notes

References

External links

 
 
 

|-

|-

1840 births
1929 deaths
Alumni of the University of London
Knights Bachelor
Lawyers from Liverpool
Liberal Unionist Party MPs for English constituencies
Mersey, John Charles Bigham, 1st Viscount
Members of the Parliament of the United Kingdom for Liverpool constituencies
People educated at Liverpool Institute High School for Boys
People from Littlehampton
Politicians from Liverpool
Queen's Bench Division judges
19th-century King's Counsel
RMS Titanic
UK MPs 1895–1900
UK MPs who were granted peerages
Mersey, John Charles Bigham, 1st Viscount
Members of the Privy Council of the United Kingdom
Freemasons of the United Grand Lodge of England
Members of the Judicial Committee of the Privy Council
Peers created by Edward VII
Viscounts created by George V
Presidents of the Probate, Divorce and Admiralty Division
Probate, Divorce and Admiralty Division judges